Pedro Jose López Jiménez (born 18 October 1942) is a Spanish businessman, and the vice chairman of Real Madrid football club since 2009.

Early life
Pedro López Jiménez was born on 18 October 1942. in Málaga. He earned a master's degree in civil engineering, and an MBA from IESE Business School.

Career
López Jiménez was chairman of Unión Fenosa, a Spanish gas and electricity distribution company, now part of the Gas Natural group and previously, in the period 1979-1982 of the public owned electricity company Endesa.

López Jiménez has been the vice chairman of Real Madrid football club since 2009. He is a board member of the European Club Association (ECA).

He was appointed a member of the board of directors of ACS Group in June 1989 (re-appointed in 1994, 1999, 2003, 2008, 2015, and 2019).

References

Living people
Real Madrid CF non-playing staff
1942 births
Spanish football chairmen and investors